Kelso railway station served the town of Kelso, Scottish Borders, Scotland from 1851 to 1964 on the Kelso Line.

History 
The station opened on 27 January 1851 by the North British Railway. Nearby were sidings with a goods and engine shed. The station closed to passengers on 15 June 1964.
The last freight train ran on 29 March 1968.

References

External links 

Disused railway stations in the Scottish Borders
Former North British Railway stations
Railway stations in Great Britain opened in 1851
Railway stations in Great Britain closed in 1964
1851 establishments in Scotland
1964 disestablishments in Scotland